Juan García de Salazar (12 February 1639 (baptized) – 8 July 1710) was a Spanish baroque composer best remembered for his choral works in the stile antico, though a few Spanish works in a more modern style have also survived.

Salazar was born in Tuesta, Álava. He was educated in the Burgos cathedral choir and became maestro de capilla at Toro (1661), El Burgo de Osma (1663) and finally at Zamora in 1668.  He died in Zamora, Spain.

Works
 Vesper psalms 
 Requiem

References

External links
Editions from the repertory of Sólo voces
Biography at classical-composers.org

Spanish Baroque composers
1639 births
1710 deaths
Spanish male classical composers
18th-century classical composers
18th-century male musicians
18th-century musicians